Mladen Frančić (11 November 1955 – 7 June 2022) was a Croatian football coach and player.

Playing career
Frančić played for Čelik Križevac, Slaven Belupo and Lokomotiva Koprivnica, before retiring in 1981.

Managerial career
As a manager, he won the Iranian league in 2004-05 with Foolad.

Death
Frančić died of a heart attack on 7 June 2022.

Managerial record

Honours
Foolad
Iran Pro League: 2004–05

References

External links

1955 births
2022 deaths
Sportspeople from Bjelovar
Yugoslav footballers
NK Slaven Belupo players
Yugoslav football managers
Croatian football managers
NK Slaven Belupo managers
Croatia national under-21 football team managers
Foolad F.C. managers
Al-Qadisiyah FC managers
Al-Watani Club managers
Al-Nahda Club (Saudi Arabia) managers
Damac FC managers
Persian Gulf Pro League managers
Saudi First Division League managers
Croatian expatriate football managers
Expatriate football managers in Iran
Croatian expatriate sportspeople in Iran
Expatriate football managers in Saudi Arabia
Croatian expatriate sportspeople in Saudi Arabia